The Schouten languages are a linkage of Austronesian languages in northern Papua New Guinea. They are in contact with various North Papuan languages, particularly the Skou and some Torricelli languages.

They are named after the Schouten Islands of Papua New Guinea.

Languages
Siau family: Arop-Sissano, Sera, Sissano, Ulau-Suain, Tumleo, Yakamul (Kap, Ali)
Kairiru linkage: Kaiep, Kairiru, Terebu
Manam linkage: Biem, Kis, Manam, Medebur, Sepa, Wogeo

Ethnologue adds Malol to Siau.

The Siau family is spoken in Sandaun Province. The Kairiru linkage is spoken in East Sepik Province. The Manam linkage is spoken in Madang Province and Wewak Islands Rural LLG of East Sepik Province.

References

External links 
 Kaipuleohone includes written notes on Manam from Robert Blust

 
North New Guinea languages
Languages of Papua New Guinea